Molla Mallory defeated Mary Browne 4–6, 6–4, 6–2 in the final to win the women's singles tennis title at the 1921 U.S. National Championships. The event was held at the West Side Tennis Club, Forest Hills, New York City, from August 15 through August 20, 1921. It was Mallory's sixth U.S. National singles title. In the second round of the event, Mallory defeated Suzanne Lenglen for the only time in her career. Suzanne Lenglen was making her only ever competitive appearance in the United States. She retired from the match after losing the first set, the only competitive loss after World War I of her career.

Draw

Final eight

References

1921
1921 in women's tennis
1921 in American women's sports
Women's Singles
1920s in New York City
1920 in sports in New York (state)
Women's sports in New York (state)
Women in New York City